Gandharv Singh ( – 9 December 2019) was an Indian politician from Himachal Pradesh. He was a legislator of the Himachal Pradesh Legislative Assembly.

Biography
Singh was elected as a legislator of the Himachal Pradesh Legislative Assembly from Banikhet in 1990 as a Bharatiya Janata Party candidate.

Singh decided to take part in the 2012 Himachal Pradesh Legislative Assembly election as a Bharatiya Janata Party candidate from Bhattiyat. But he was not nominated and Bikram Singh Jariyal was nominated instead of him. He became angry with Bharatiya Janata Party and sat on hunger strike. Later, he quit the party and joined Indian National Congress.

Singh died on 9 December 2019 at the age of 87.

References

1930s births
2019 deaths
Himachal Pradesh MLAs 1990–1992
Indian National Congress politicians from Himachal Pradesh
Bharatiya Janata Party politicians from Himachal Pradesh
People from Chamba district